The Metro Manila Film Festival Award for Best Director is an award presented annually by the Metropolitan Manila Development Authority (MMDA). It was first awarded at the 1st Metro Manila Film Festival ceremony, held in 1975; Augusto Buenaventura received the award for directing the film, Diligan Mo ng Hamog ang Uhaw na Lupa and it is given to directors working in the motion picture industry.  Currently, nominees and winners are determined by Executive Committees, headed by the Metropolitan Manila Development Authority Chairman and key members of the film industry.

Winners and nominees

1970s

1980s

1990s

2000s

2010s

2020s

Multiple awards for Best Director
Throughout the history of Metro Manila Film Festival (MMFF), there have been directors who received multiple Awards for Best Director. As of 2019 (45nd MMFF), 11 directors have received two or more Best Director awards.

Notes

References

External links
IMDB: Metro Manila Film Festival
Official website of the Metro Manila Film Festival

Director
Awards for best director